John Jacob Sher (16 March 1913 – 23 August 1988) was an American newspaper columnist, songwriter, film director, film writer, and producer.

Career 
Born in Minneapolis, Sher wrote for several magazines, including the Saturday Evening Post, Esquire, Redbook, Radio Mirror, Reader's Digest, and Collier's. He also had been a columnist for the New York Reporter, and from 1937 to 1940 Screen & Radio Weekly, a nationally syndicated Sunday supplement published by the Detroit Free Press.

Sher wrote a number of films for Audie Murphy, including in 1959, The Wild and the Innocent, which he also directed. In the 1979 remake for TV, The Kid from Left Field, Gary Coleman (1968–2010), who starred in the series, accepted the NAACP Image Award for Best Children's Special of Episode in a Series. Sher's 1971–1972 television play, Goodbye, Raggedy Ann was nominated for an Emmy for Outstanding Writing Achievement in Drama – Original Teleplay.

Selected Credits

Broadway 
 The Perfect Set-Up? – playwright
 Songs:
 "Make This a Slow Goodbye," Jack Sher (words), Farlan Myers (music)

Film 

 My Favorite Spy (1951) – writer
 Shane (1953) – writer
 Off Limits (1953) – writer
 The Kid from Left Field (1953) – writer
 World in My Corner (1956) – writer
 Walk the Proud Land (1956) – writer
 Four Girls in Town (1957) – writer, director
 Joe Butterfly (1957) – writer
 Kathy O' (1958) – writer, director
 The Wild and the Innocent (1959) – writer, director
 The 3 Worlds of Gulliver (1960) – writer, director
 Love in a Goldfish Bowl (1961) – writer, director
 Paris Blues (1961) – writer
 Critic's Choice (1963) – writer
 Move Over, Darling (1963) – writer
 Slither (1973) – producer

Television 
 Bewitched – 3 episodes
 "It Takes One to Know One (26 November 1964; season 1, episode 11) – writer
 "No More Mr. Nice Guy" (23 March 1967; season 3, episode 28) – writer
 "Art for Sam's Sake" (23 February 1967; season 3, episode 24) – writer
 The Wackiest Ship in the Army – 1 episode
 "The Stowaway" (31 October 1965; season 1, episode 7) – writer
 Goodbye, Raggedy Ann (1971) – producer, writer
 Holmes and Yo-Yo (1976–77) (TV series) – creator
 The Kid from Left Field (1979) – writer

Books 
 Twelve Sport Immortals, Ernest Victor Heyn (1904–1995) (ed.), Bartholomew House (1951); 
 Sher contributed 8 essays

 Twelve More Sport Immortals, Ernest Victor Heyn (1904–1995) (ed.), Bartholomew House (1951); 
 Sher contributed 6 or more essays

References

External links

1913 births
1988 deaths
American columnists
American male dramatists and playwrights
20th-century American journalists
American male journalists
American directors
American male songwriters
American lyricists
American television writers
20th-century American screenwriters
20th-century male musicians